Shurjeh Kord (also Romanized as Shūrjeh Kord; also known as Shūrjeh and Shūrjeh Ḩamīdīyeh) is a village in Baruq Rural District, Baruq District, Miandoab County, West Azerbaijan Province, Iran. At the 2006 census, its population was 357, in 83 families.

References 

Populated places in Miandoab County